Andrew Jones (born 1944) is a British historian of nineteenth century British politics.

Jones was a Fellow of Trinity Hall, Cambridge from 1969 until 1971. In 1971 he was appointed lecturer in history at the University of Reading. His 1972 study of the high politics surrounding the Representation of the People Act 1884, The Politics of Reform 1884, was appraised by Michael Bentley as "masterly" and "an eloquent, precisely-mouthed challenge to those who would try to make of history something it is not".

Works
The Politics of Reform 1884 (Cambridge: Cambridge University Press, 1972). 
'Where ‘Governing is the Use of Words’', The Historical Journal, Vol. 19, No. 1 (March 1976), pp. 251-256.

Notes

1944 births
Fellows of Trinity Hall, Cambridge
Academics of the University of Reading
20th-century British historians
Living people
Place of birth missing (living people)